Stana Katic (born ) is a Canadian-American actress and producer. She played Kate Beckett on the ABC television romantic crime series Castle (2009–2016) and FBI Special Agent Emily Byrne in the psychological thriller series Absentia (2017–2020).

Early life 
Katic was born in Hamilton, Ontario, Canada. In describing her ethnicity, she has stated "My parents are Serbs from Croatia. I call us Dalmatian because that's the part of the planet that we are originally from. I have Serb, Croat and even a handful of Montenegrin family members." Her father is from Vrlika, Croatia, and her mother is from the surrounding area of Sinj, Croatia. 

Katic later moved with her family to Aurora, Illinois. She spent the following years moving back and forth between Canada and the United States. After graduating from West Aurora High School in 1996, Katic enrolled to study International Relations, Economics and pre-law at the University of Toronto's Trinity College and then at The Theatre School at DePaul University, where she studied toward an MFA in acting from 2000 to 2002. Katic studied acting at the Beverly Hills Playhouse acting school. She has four brothers and one sister.

Career
Katic played Hana Gitelman in Heroes, Collette Stenger in 24s season five, and Jenny in the film Feast of Love starring Morgan Freeman. She also played Morgenstern in Frank Miller's film The Spirit,  Canadian Intelligence agent Corrine Veneau in the James Bond film Quantum of Solace (though she was originally up for the role of Strawberry Fields in the film), and Simone Renoir in the third installment of The Librarian franchise, The Librarian: Curse of the Judas Chalice.

In August 2008, ABC announced acquisition of the television series Castle, starring Katic as Kate Beckett and Nathan Fillion as Richard Castle. In 2008, Katic established her own production company, Sine Timore Productions, which is Latin for "without fear".

BuddyTV named Katic as Kate Beckett in Castle as No. 24 on its list of "TV's 100 Sexiest Women of 2009", No. 39 in 2010, No. 1 in 2011, No. 8 in 2012 and No. 12 in 2013; No. 6 on its list of "The 15 Best Drama Lead Actresses of the 2011–2012 TV Season"; named her character's relationship with the title character as No. 18 (and the Best Flirting Relationship) on its list "Love Is All Around: Best TV Relationships of 2010", No. 13 (and the Best Delayed Relationship) on its list of "The Best Relationships of 2011", No. 15 on its list of "The Special Relationships: TV’s Top 50 Love Stories of the Past Decade", No. 1 on its list "Love... Or Not: The Top 12 Will-They-or-Won't-They Couples of 2012" and No. 2 on its list "Lip Smacking Good: The Best Kisses of 2012"; named Castle as No. 6 on its list of "The 11 Best Returning TV Shows of 2011", No. 11 on "The 15 Best Dramas of the 2011–2012 TV Season" and No. 12 on "The 12 Best Dramas of 2012". Katic also has been on the Maxim Hot 100 list for three consecutive years.

In the summer of 2010, Katic filmed For Lovers Only with the Polish brothers in France and The Double with Richard Gere. At the third annual Shorty Awards held on 28 March 2011, she won the actress category. In May 2011, she won the Most Glamorous Actress online ballot for the Monte-Carlo Television Festival. She received 17.3% of the 3,641 votes against a field of 15 finalists.

She served as a jury member at the 29 May-5 June 2011 Film Festival Zlín, where For Lovers Only made its world premiere. Big Sur, in which she plays Lenore Kandel, premiered at the Sundance Film Festival on 23 January 2013. In conjunction with the 2011 San Diego Comic-Con International, there was an official announcement in Entertainment Weekly that she would become the voice for Talia al Ghul in Batman: Arkham City.

On 28 January 2012, she was a presenter at the 64th Annual Directors Guild of America Awards ceremony. She was the recipient of the PRISM Award for Performance in a Drama Episode at the 16th Annual PRISM Awards for her portrayal of suffering from post-traumatic stress disorder in the Castle season-four episode "Kill Shot". Katic was nominated for the 39th People's Choice Awards in the Favorite Dramatic TV Actress category. At the 40th People's Choice Awards, Katic won the Favorite Dramatic TV Actress category, while the show won Favorite TV Crime Drama.

Katic portrayed rock singer and producer Genya Ravan in the 2013 film CBGB. On 18 April 2016, ABC announced that Katic was slated to exit Castle ahead of a potential ninth season. ABC and ABC Studios did not renew Katic's contract following season eight. Castle was canceled on 12 May 2016 after eight seasons.

Katic played Carolina Baxter in the Lifetime film Sister Cities that premiered on 17 September 2016. On 26 September 2016, she appeared in White Rabbit Red Rabbit by Nassim Soleimanpour at New York's Westside Theatre. Katic starred as Rachel Rozman in the 2016 film, The Rendezvous, directed by Amin Matalqa and co-starring Raza Jaffrey. In 2016, Katic was cast in the horror film Cadaver In January 2017, Katic appeared as Anna in the film Lost in Florence.

Katic was cast as Emily Byrne in the AXN series Absentia that premiered in 2017.

In 2019, she played the role of Vera Atkins in A Call to Spy. The title being a stylistic variant to a call to arms, the film is inspired by the true stories of three women who worked as spies in World War II.

Personal life
Katic lives in Los Angeles. She speaks English, Serbian, French and Italian fluently.

She founded The Alternative Travel Project in 2010 which is an initiative to encourage people to Go Car Free for just one day and seek out alternative methods of public transportation to reduce the environmental impact of personal vehicles.
Katic wrote the lyrics for "Hey Blue Eyes", which she sang for fans at the 51st Zlín Film Festival in 2011.
She holds dual citizenship in Canada and the United States.

Katic married her longtime boyfriend, Kris Brkljac, an Australian business efficiency consultant, in a private ceremony in Croatia on 25 April 2015, one day before her 37th birthday.

On 19 June 2022, a representative of Katic confirmed that Katic and Brkljac welcomed their first child during the winter.

Filmography

Film

Television

Video games

Awards and nominations

References

External links

 
 

1978 births
Living people
20th-century American actresses
20th-century Canadian actresses
21st-century American actresses
21st-century Canadian actresses
Actresses from Hamilton, Ontario
Actresses from Illinois
American film actresses
American people of Croatian descent
American people of Montenegrin descent
American people of Serbian descent
American television actresses
Canadian emigrants to the United States
Canadian expatriate actresses in the United States
Canadian film actresses
Canadian people of Croatian descent
Canadian people of Montenegrin descent
Canadian people of Serbian descent
Canadian television actresses
People from Aurora, Illinois
People with acquired American citizenship
Shorty Award winners